Union Station Technology Center is a former union train station in South Bend, Indiana in the United States.

History

Opened in 1929 and situated across the tracks from the Studebaker auto plant, the building served the New York Central Railroad and Grand Trunk Western Railroad. It was designed by the architectural firm Fellheimer & Wagner. NYC's Detroit-Chicago "Great Steel Fleet" and GTW's Chicago-Canada trains used this station. 

When the New York Central merged with the Pennsylvania Railroad in 1968 to make the Penn Central Transportation Company, it used the station as well.

The building was purchased by South Bend native and University of Notre Dame graduate Kevin M. Smith in 1979.

Union Station Technology Center today is in use by Global Access Point, which renovated the facility to become a data center, housing computing equipment from outside companies. The Technology Center is a state-of-the-art hub for digital information, providing a location for small businesses, data centers, data transport and carrier operations.

The railway corridor adjacent to the station carries not only trains, but also a fiber-optic trunkline. The Union Staten Technology Center functions as a colocation centre.

In November 2019, the South Bend Tribune, the city's 147-year-old daily newspaper, moved its offices into Union Station Technology Center. The Tribune previously had been located at 225 West Colfax Avenue in South Bend.

See also
 Proposed new South Shore Line station in South Bend
 Union Station (disambiguation)

References

External links
South Bend Union Station (Great Railroad Stations -- TrainWeb)
Historic South Bend Railroads and Stations (South Bend's Historical Heritage)
Union Station Technology Center (Global Access Point website)

Former railway stations in Indiana
South Bend
South Bend
South Bend
Railway stations in the United States opened in 1929
Railway stations closed in 1971
Buildings and structures in South Bend, Indiana
1929 establishments in Indiana
1971 disestablishments in Indiana
Railway stations in St. Joseph County, Indiana